TVS (abbreviation of Televisão Santomense, English: Santomean TV) is the public television broadcaster of São Tomé and Príncipe.

About the station
TVS (Televisão Santomense) started broadcasting in September 13, 1992.

The station and its offices are located in the neighborhood of Fruta just a kilometer south-southwest of the center of São Tomé.

For many years, it had been the only television network in the country.

The network is the broadcaster of its matches featuring each of the island's major football (soccer) clubs in the São Tomé First Division and rarely the Príncipe Island League as well as the regional cups of the islands of São Tomé and Príncipe.  It broadcasts all the coverage of the São Tomé and Príncipe Championship and the São Tomé e Príncipe Cup at the end of the year, at the start of the year, it broadcasts the São Tomé and Príncipe Super Cup match each year.  The station also broadcast some other sports.

Recently, the network started broadcasting some FIFA World Cup matches.

See also
List of television stations in Africa
Media of São Tomé and Príncipe
Rádio Nacional de São Tomé e Príncipe - country's radio station - first radio station, aired in the mid-20th century

References

External links
Official website 
List of television stations at the website of São Tomé and Príncipe

São Tomé
Television stations in São Tomé and Príncipe
Portuguese-language television networks